Francisco Santos Calderón (born 14 August 1961), also known as Pacho Santos, is a Colombian politician and journalist. Santos was elected as Álvaro Uribe's running mate and became Vice President in 2002. Santos was re-elected in 2006 for a second term with President Uribe. His great-uncle Eduardo Santos was President of Colombia from 1938 to 1942 and he is also a cousin of former president Juan Manuel Santos. Santos was appointed Ambassador of Colombia to the United States in 2018. He presented his credentials to president Donald Trump on 17 September 2018 and served until 2020.

Biography

Education
Santos, like his cousin, ex-President of Colombia Juan Manuel Santos, attended high school at Colegio San Carlos a private all-male elite school in Bogotá. Both are also graduates of the University of Kansas in Lawrence, Kansas, United States.

Santos also graduated from the University of Texas at Austin and attended Harvard as a Nieman Fellow.

Kidnapping
In 1990 the Medellín Cartel led by Pablo Escobar kidnapped him to pressure the Colombian government to revert its support of drug lords' extraditions to the United States.

Human rights advocate
Upon his return, Santos became an advocate of human rights in Colombia, especially those of victims affected by kidnapping after he himself suffered from this practice. He created a non-governmental organisation called Fundación Pais Libre (Free Country Foundation), with the intentions of advancing awareness and helping the victims and their families. However, he has been criticised due to polemic declarations that support repression against students involved in protests.

Plan Colombia
2007 in an interview for the film documentary The War on Drugs Santos defends Plan Colombia and the use of aerial fumigation as a tool for Coca eradication in Colombia.

Shared Responsibility
Since 2008, Santos has spoken as part of the Shared Responsibility campaign to raise public awareness of cocaine production's impacts on Colombia's forest biodiversity, including deforestation and chemical contamination. The campaign links cocaine use to environmental destruction.

Ambassador of Colombia to the United States of America
Santos served as Ambassador of Colombia to the United States of America in Washington D.C. from September 2018 to 2020. He was succeeded by Juan Carlos Pinzón.

Popular culture 
 In TV series Pablo Escobar, The Drug Lord is portrayed by the Colombian actor Gustavo Ángel as the character of Fernán Santana.

References

External links
globalsecurity.org - Francisco Santos Calderón
Fundacion Pais Libre - Quienes somos
 Santos appears in the film documentary The War on Drugs
 Santos Interview on YouTube

|-

|-

1961 births
Living people
Francisco
Colombian activists
Colombian human rights activists
Colombian journalists
Male journalists
Harvard Extension School alumni
Kidnapped Colombian people
Kidnapped politicians
Maria Moors Cabot Prize winners
University of Kansas alumni
University of Texas at Austin alumni
Politicians from Bogotá
Ambassadors of Colombia to the United States
Vice presidents of Colombia
Colombia First politicians
Democratic Center (Colombia) politicians